Carré is a French word, which means "square". Carré may also refer to:

People
Carré (surname)
Carré Otis, American model and actress

Places
Fort Carré, sixteenth-century fort in France
Vieux Carré, French Quarter of New Orleans
Chapeau Carré, second highest peak on the island of Carriacou in the Grenada Grenadines
Chapeau Carré, populated place near Boucan-Carré, Haiti
Bonnet Carré Spillway, a flood control structure near New Orleans, Louisiana

Other
Carré Theatre, one of the leading theatres in the Netherlands, founded by Oscar Carré
Carré (Stockhausen), composition for four orchestras and four choirs by Karlheinz Stockhausen
Carré, an infantry battle formation, more usually known as the infantry square
A type of bet in Roulette

See also

Carrè
Carle (disambiguation)
Carrè, town in Italy

Carrée
Equirectangular projection, also known as plate carrée
Maison Carrée, temple at Nîmes in southern France
French name for the double whole note, which has a rectangular notehead in mensural notation